

Barton is a village in Warwickshire, England, on the river Avon, near Bidford-on-Avon. It forms part of the civil parish of Bidford-on-Avon.  The name appears in 1315 as Berton.

See also
 Thomas Lee, former rector

References

Sources

External links

Villages in Warwickshire
Bidford-on-Avon